Nakajima Natsu is a Japanese dancer and one of the first female butoh dancers. She studied with Ohno Kazuo and worked with Hijikata Tatsumi. She also founded the dance company Muteki-sha in 1969.

Life and career 
Nakajima was born in 1943 in Sakhalin, which was occupied by Japan at the time.

In 1955, she began to study classical ballet, and entered the Ohno Kazuo Dance Institute in 1962. Unlike her mentor and long-time collaborator Hijikata Tatsumi, Nakajima toured extensively outside of Japan and became not only one of the first female butoh dancers, but also one of the first, to introduce the form to audiences outside of Japan. She directed and choreographed the second-generation butoh dance group Muteki-sha.

She has appeared in films as well as theater productions, including Adachi Masao's 1969 film Sexual Play and the 1990 documentary Butoh: Body on the Edge of Crisis.

Dance philosophy 
Nakajima, like most butoh choreographers, resists literal interpretations or expressions of the dance's gestures. However, she has articulated her dance philosophy, emphasizing the energy and freedom of butoh. Natsu said  "Butoh should reject any notion of symbolism, message, or formalism, and only express its energy and freedom. It is not art that I aspire to, but love."

References 

Living people
1943 births